Longshan Subdistrict may refer to the following locations in the People's Republic of China:

Written as "龙山街道":
Longshan Subdistrict, Beijing, in Huairou District, Beijing
Longshan Subdistrict, Fuqing, in Fuqing, Fujian
Longshan Subdistrict, Jia County, Henan, in Jia County, Henan
Longshan Subdistrict, Linzhou, Henan, in Linzhou, Henan
Longshan Subdistrict, Qiyang County, in Qiyang County, Hunan
Longshan Subdistrict, Chaoyang, Liaoning, in Shuangta District, Chaoyang, Liaoning
Longshan Subdistrict, Jimo, in Jimo, Shandong
Longshan Subdistrict, Zhangqiu, in Zhangqiu, Shandong

Written as "龙山路街道":
Longshan Road Subdistrict, Anqing, in Daguan District, Anqing, Anhui
Longshan Road Subdistrict, Wendeng, in Wendeng, Shandong
Longshan Road Subdistrict, Zaozhuang, in Shizhong District, Zaozhuang, Shandong